This is a list of characters in the original sequel Oz books by L. Frank Baum's successors.  The series was continued by Ruth Plumly Thompson, John R. Neill, Jack Snow, Rachel Cosgrove Payes, Eloise Jarvis McGraw and Lauren McGraw, Dick Martin, Eric Shanower, his grandson Roger S. Baum and Sherwood Smith.

Humans from the "real world"

Jam
Jonathan Andrew Manley, nicknamed "Jam", is a boy from Ohio who is the son of a biologist and first appears in Rachel Cosgrove Payes' The Hidden Valley of Oz. He alongside two guinea pigs and a laboratory rat (Percy) arrived in Gillikin Country on a large collapsible kite. After escaping from Terp the Terrible, Jam befriended Dorothy, Scarecrow, Tin Man, Cowardly Lion, and Hungry Tiger who agreed to help him against Terp the Terrible. They even get a new party member in the form of the Leopard with the Changeable Spots. After Terp the Terrible is defeated, Jam attends a celebratory banquet before he is returned to Ohio by Princess Ozma and the Wizard of Oz.

In the rejected first draft of chapter 1 of Hidden Valley, Jam arrives in Oz by a rocket ship rather than a kite. Reilly & Lee's editors rewrote this, possibly due to its similarity to Ruth Plumly Thompson's The Yellow Knight of Oz (1930), or to another author's rejected Oz book submission, in order to avoid allegations of plagiarism.

While Payes brought Percy the rat back for further appearances, Jam never appeared again in her work. As Hidden Valley remains under copyright until 2047, new stories featuring the character are unlikely. However, in 1966, Henry S. Blossom featured Jam in The Blue Emperor of Oz, a work which was not circulated widely enough to attract accusation of copyright infringement.

Jenny Jump
Jenny Jump is an important character in the four Oz books of John R. Neill. Living in New Jersey at the time, Neill named her after Jenny Jump Mountain.

Jenny begins as a fifteen-year-old in New Jersey, who one day finds a leprechaun stealing her cheese. She is clever enough to capture him with her stare, so that the leprechaun, called Siko Pompus must grant her a wish. She wishes to become a fairy, and the leprechaun transforms her. In the midst of this psychedelia, however, Jenny's gaze falters, and the leprechaun eludes her control, leaving her part-fairy and part-human. Still, Jenny has remarkable new abilities. With her fairy foot, she leaps all the way to the Land of Oz, to begin her adventures.

Jenny is not a fan of the traditional, single-color fashions favored by the Ozites, and she sets up a shop with a magic turnstile that dresses people according to their personalities.

Neill's text of The Wonder City of Oz was heavily rewritten by an anonymous editor at Reilly & Lee, and that editor added some controversial changes to the story, in particular, involving Jenny Jump. These additions include creatures who live in the Deadly Desert called Heelers, who live on shoes. Jenny is goaded into running against Princess Ozma as ruler of Oz. It is not taken very seriously by the Ozites, and it is decided that shoes will be used for votes in an Ozelection. The Ozelection and all that leads up to it is not in the manuscript. Furthermore, near the end of the novel, the Wizard casts a spell to make her younger and more obedient while removing the three creatures behind her flaws that become visible to everyone present: bad temper is a black wasp, envy is a green snake, and ambition is a fat red toad. Neill was not enamored of these changes and did not illustrate them (except for one image of the de-aged Jenny at the very end), and Jenny seems to have gone back to her old self in the two sequels (although she is more compassionate to her underlings).

Jenny is regularly accompanied by a Munchkin boy called Number Nine, who loves her even though she treats him like a slave during the first book. She has him wear whistling breeches that alert her to his presence.

In The Scalawagons of Oz, Jenny is again a main character, when she joins the trans-Oz search for the stolen magical cars. In Lucky Bucky in Oz, she is one of the planners of the grand Emerald City gala, but is only a background character, while Number Nine is a more prominent actor in the plot.

In The Runaway in Oz, whose publication was delayed over a half-century after the author's death, Jenny helps get the story started by quarreling with Scraps the Patchwork Girl; but once Scraps runs away, Jenny spends the rest of the book helping to look for her.

As Jenny is a copyrighted character, she is not found in modern Oz expanded universe stories, save Oziana magazine.

Notta Bit More
Notta Bit More is a circus clown from North America.

He first appears in The Cowardly Lion of Oz where he stumbles upon a magic phrase that sends him and a little orphan boy named Bobby Downs (also called Bob Up) to the Munchkin Country kingdom of Mudge. King Mustafa wanted them to bring the Cowardly Lion to him. When the two of them met the Cowardly Lion, he joined their party alongside a bird named Nickadoodle as she fell in love with Notta. When King Mustafa has been defeated by Princess Ozma and her allies, Notta Bit More accepted Princess Ozma's offer to live in the Land of Oz where he resides in a tent outside the Royal Palace. He also adopts the orphan Bob.

Notta Bit More appears in Return to Oz. He is seen in the background at the coronation scene at the end.

Peter Brown

Peter Brown is a boy from Philadelphia and protagonist of several Oz books by Ruth Plumly Thompson. He is first introduced in The Gnome King of Oz (1927), and reappears in Jack Pumpkinhead of Oz (1929) and Pirates in Oz (1931). The first and third of these feature Ruggedo the Nome King as the primary antagonist, while Pumpkinhead pits Peter and Jack against a "Red Baron" who seeks to invade and conquer the feudal domains of his neighbors before marching on the Emerald City. Peter's athleticism, as an ace pitcher in little league baseball, often comes into play in defeating obstacles.

Based on Gnome King's copyright, Peter will become available for other authors to use on 1 January 2023.

Robin Brown
Robin Brown is the protagonist of Merry Go Round in Oz. He is a small boy raised by an adoptive family of large boys who mistreat him before he escapes to Oz on Merry Go Round, a living Merry Go Round horse. He becomes King of Roundabout for a short time against his will.

Speedy
Speedy is the protagonist of The Yellow Knight of Oz and Speedy in Oz.  He is the nephew of William J. Harmstead, an eccentric inventor from Long Island, who raised Speedy after his parents were killed in a maritime accident in the South Seas. Speedy's first name appears to be William as well, although whether he shares his uncle's surname is unclear. He first comes to Oz when Uncle Billy's rocket ship, which Speedy was test-piloting, flies out of control. Landing in the underground nation of Subterranea, Speedy escapes to the surface and finds himself in the Winkie Country, where he joins a quest to rescue the kingdom of the Yellow Knight from an evil enchantment. Four years later, Speedy and Uncle are on a paleontological expedition in Wyoming, where a magic geyser brings a large dinosaur skeleton to life. Speedy and the dinosaur (named Terrybubble after a stuttering exclamation which Speedy made impulsively) land on Umbrella Island as it flies through the sky, and Speedy soon discovers an insidious plot to kidnap Gureeda, the island king's daughter, with whom Speedy is beginning to fall in love.

Copyright has made it difficult for other authors to use Speedy. His first novel enters the public domain on 1 January 2026.

Emerald City

Davy Jones
Davy Jones is a wooden whale who appears in Lucky Bucky in Oz.

Davy Jones originally served as a ship for some pirates until he abandoned them on an island they attacked. He met Bucky Jones who stated that he is not a pirate and they traveled the ocean. They came across various obstacles when making their way to the Land of Oz. The Wizard of Oz later offered Davy Jones a job where he now resides in Lake Quad which is two miles south of the Emerald City.

Davy is popular among fans as one of Neill's more innovative and memorable creations, with his origin (unaddressed by Neill) being a popular matter for speculative guesswork. Due to copyright protection, Davy will not become available for other authors to use without special permission, until his novel enters the public domain on 1 January 2038.

Herby
Herby is a character featured in the Oz books of Ruth Plumly Thompson. He was introduced in her 1928 novel, The Giant Horse of Oz, as a medical doctor who had been transformed into a bottle of cough syrup by Mombi. He was freed from his transformation by Prince Philidor of Ozure Isles early in the novel, but retained a three-shelf medicine chest in his chest and cough drop eyes, and by the end of the novel, was proclaimed the Court Physician in the Emerald City palace, although, because Ozites are almost never sick and cannot die of natural causes, he does not have much work to do, only treating occasional injuries.

Herby's name probably derives from the medicinal herbs that would have been contained in his chest. He appeared subsequently in Jack Pumpkinhead of Oz, Ojo in Oz, The Wishing Horse of Oz, Handy Mandy in Oz, and Ozoplaning with the Wizard of Oz, although never in a prominent role.

Mark E. Haas published his first Oz book, The Medicine Man of Oz,  based around Herby, in 2000. Charges of copyright infringement led to the book's withdrawal from mainstream markets, as Giant Horse is protected until 1 January 2024.

Snip
Snip is a boy who appears in The Lost King of Oz.

He is a boy who was captured by Mombi to aid her and Pajuku in finding King Pastoria. When traversing through Blankenberg, the three of them met an amnesiac tailor named Tora who joins them on their quest. When Dorothy, Humpy, and Kabumpo meet up with them, Snip is among those who thought that Humpy was the enchanted form of King Pastoria. It turns out that Tora was actually the enchanted form of King Pastoria. After King Pastoria allows his daughter Princess Ozma to continue ruling the Emerald City, he became a tailor where Snip became his apprentice.

Humpy
Humpy is a live test dummy that appears in The Lost King of Oz.

He was originally in Hollywood until Dorothy briefly arrived and brought him to the Land of Oz. After escaping the Back-woodsmen of the Back Woods, the two of them run into Kabumpo who carries them on his back. Humpy, Dorothy, and Kabumpo come across Mombi, Snip, Tora, and Pajuka where it was thought that Humpy was the long-lost King Pastoria. After it was discovered that Tora is actually King Pastoria and he allows his daughter Princess Ozma to continue ruling the Emerald City, King Pastoria started a tailor shop in the Emerald City with Humpy working as his tailor's dummy.

Sir Hokus of Pokes
Sir Hokus of Pokes is a character who is first introduced in The Royal Book of Oz by Ruth Plumly Thompson. His name is a reference to hocus pocus. He is an elderly knight, who doesn't realise that he is obsolete, in the vein of Don Quixote. Sir Hokus was discovered in the kingdom of Pokes, where he had been snoring for several centuries. Pokes is a small, sleepy (literally) kingdom by the road in Winkie Country, by the Winkie River. After joining Dorothy, Cowardly Lion, Comfortable Camel, and Doubtful Dromedary on an adventure, Sir Hokus returns with her to live at the Palace in the Emerald City.

In later books, he accompanies the main characters on several quests, and has a particularly significant adventure in The Yellow Knight of Oz and marries Princess Marygolden of Corabia. In that book, we learn that his current state is the result of magic of the Sultan of Samandra, a kingdom between Corumbia and Corabia where animals cannot speak. His favorite steed, the Comfortable Camel is immediately stuck dumb upon entering it. At the end of the novel, he becomes the younger Corum, Prince of Corumbia, the Yellow Knight of Oz, struck with the pit of a magic date that turns his silver armor golden and transforms him into a young, blond-haired man. Although Sir Hokus's disenchantment changed his appearance significantly, after his initial identification as Corum, he was referred to as Sir Hokus for the rest of the book. He does, however, receive a new steed, Stampedro, whom Speedy frees from enchantment and who facilitates Hokus's restoration.

This character shift was met with negative reaction from the fan base, and Thompson is reported to have been planning away to undo this element. In John R. Neill's writing, Hokus tends to be back to his old self, such as in The Scalawagons of Oz, when he play-fights a two-headed Dragonette. Even Thompson showed him as his implicitly old self and referred to him as Sir Hokus in a brief appearance in the Emerald City in Yankee in Oz (1972).

The entry of his first appearance into the public domain in 1997 made Hokus freely available to be used by other authors.

In an episode of Dorothy and the Wizard of Oz, he is voiced by Tom Kenny.

Percy
Percy is a laboratory rat from Ohio who debuts in Rachel Cosgrove Payes' The Hidden Valley of Oz. He came to the Land of Oz with Jam and two guinea pigs where they landed in Gillikin Country. At different points when it comes to the quest to defeat Terp the Terrible, Percy ate some of Terp the Terrible's special muffins that caused him to grow 10 times his usual size. After Terp the Terrible was defeated and Jam was sent back to Ohio, Percy persuaded the Wizard of Oz to permanently enlarge him. Percy has a "smart aleck" personality, frequently referring to everyone he meets as "kiddo."

In Payes' The Wicked Witch of Oz, Percy accompanied Dorothy Gale when the Wicked Witch of the South awakens from her long slumber.

Percy is the subject of Payes' shorter piece "Percy and the Shrinking Violet".

In the early 1990s, Payes was interviewed by The Baum Bugle in preparation for a rerelease of Hidden Valley and the first edition of the hitherto unpublished Wicked Witch. She explained that many of Percy's more bizarre traits, such as the "kiddos," were added in by Reilly & Lee editors without her consent, in an attempt to make the book more relevant with the slang of 1951.

As Percy remains under copyright, he generally is not used by other authors. However, Ray Powell bucked this restriction by including Percy in the rarely circulated novel The Raggedys in Oz (a crossover between Oz and the creations of Johnny Gruelle) in the 1980s.

Gillikin Country

Agnes
Agnes is a dragon who appeared in The Giant Horse of Oz. She is the close friend and assistant of the Good Witch of the North.

Great Royal Marshmallow
The Great Royal Marshmallow is a marshmallow man that rules over the Candy Country. In Dorothy of Oz, Dorothy and Toto are brought before the Great Royal Marshmallow by the Royal Sheriff when they broke the law of picking lollipops. The Great Royal Marshmallow was not pleased with what the Royal Sheriff told him as Dorothy learns the Great Royal Marshmallow is depressed due to a stomachache. Dorothy convinces the Royal Sheriff to let her help the Great Royal Marshmallow get rid of his stomachache. Dorothy tells the Great Royal Marshmallow to stick to eating marshmallows for a while until his stomach is feeling better. When the Great Royal Marshmallow pardons Dorothy and Toto of their crime, Dorothy tells the Great Royal Marshmallow that she came to the Land of Oz upon being told by Glinda the Good Witch that the Land of Oz is in danger. The Great Royal Marshmallow helps Dorothy by having his subjects give Dorothy some supplies for her journey ranging from baskets containing fruits, an assortment of candy, and an assortment of nuts. The Great Royal Marshmallow has the Royal Sheriff escort Dorothy and Toto to the border as he tells Dorothy that Princess Gayelette can help her.

Jester
The Jester is a servant of Princess Gayelette and Prince Quelala.

In Dorothy of Oz, the Jester had gotten his hands on a wand of the Wicked Witch of the West and was possessed by her ghost. Under the Wicked Witch of the West's possession, the Jester used the wand to turn Princess Gayelette, Prince Quelala, and their dinner guests into China Dolls. He even managed to do the same thing to Scarecrow, Tin Man, and Cowardly Lion as well as abduct the China Princess from the Dainty China Country. When Dorothy and Toto arrived in Princess Gayelette's kingdom, they run into the Jester who points them to Princess Gayelette's castle. When Dorothy learns about the Jester's actions, she returns to the main hall and found that the Jester had turned Toto into a China Doll as the Jester shows Dorothy his China Doll collection. Dorothy came up with an idea to bring Glinda the Good Witch to the Jester under the condition that Toto, Scarecrow, Tin Man, and Cowardly Lion assists her. The Jester agrees to Dorothy's deal, but Toto will remain with him. When the Scarecrow, Tin Man, and Cowardly Lion slipped into their China Doll disguises upon arrival outside of Princess Gayelette's castle, Dorothy then meets up with the Jester who shows Dorothy his collection which is now on the outside. Dorothy takes the Jester to the red wagon where Dorothy has him open the crates where she claims that Glinda is in one of them claiming that Glinda turned herself, Scarecrow, Tin Man, and Cowardly Lion into china dolls. Dorothy then hears the voice of the Wicked Witch of the West's ghost who suspects a trick and orders the Jester to turn Dorothy into a china doll quickly. As the Wicked Witch of the West's ghost continues to warn the Jester of Dorothy's trick, the Cowardly Lion's tail comes out of his disguise as the Jester prepares to attack. Dorothy reminds the Jester that jesters are supposed to make people happy causing the Jester to freeze in his tracks as the Wicked Witch of the West's ghost urges the Jester to turn Dorothy into a china doll. The Jester gives up the wand as the Wicked Witch of the West's ghost fades away. Thus, the spell is broken and everyone is returned to normal. Scarecrow, Tin Man, Cowardly Lion, and Toto rejoice now that the spell is broken. When Dorothy asks Princess Gayelette and Prince Quelala if the Jester can stay and jest for them again as a way to prove that he is sorry, Princess Gayelette accepts Dorothy's deals and has the Jester entertain them again.

The Jester appears in Legends of Oz: Dorothy's Return (loosely based on the Dorothy of Oz book) voiced by Martin Short. In the film, he is stated to be the brother of the Wicked Witch of the West and his Earth counterpart is a con artist claiming to be a government appraiser. The Jester has been capturing important people throughout the Land of Oz like His Woodjesty of the Twigs, the Bandmaster of Tune Town, Queen Else of Somewhere, General Blotz, General Candy Apple, Grand Bozzywood of Samandra, the Ferryman of Winkie River, Chief Dipper of Pumperdink, and Baron Belfaygor of Bourne.

Kabumpo

Kabumpo is an Indian elephant who appears in several of the Ruth Plumly Thompson Oz books, including a titular role in Kabumpo in Oz.

King Kinda Jolly
King Kinda Jolly of Kimbaloo is a character in The Lost King of Oz. The short and stout king of Kimbaloo, is a jolly little Gillikin in the kingdom known for its button trees and the crops they provide. Kinda Jolly wears a silver crown to match his silver beard, and is married to the sweet little Queen, Rosa Merry. He is the leader of the 249 other male citizens of Kimbaloo, and in charge of the button crops. He loves his people dearly and is loved by them. He once hired the witch Mombi as a cook in his palace, against the advice of Hah Hoh, the town laugher of the kingdom, since he took pity on the friendless old woman, and did not know she was, in fact, a former witch.

Leopard with the Changeable Spots
The Leopard with the Changeable Spots, nicknamed "Spots", is a leopard that lives in an unnamed jungle in Gillikin Country as seen in The Hidden Valley of Oz. He gets his name from the markings on his coat change, both randomly and in response to his feelings. They shift "from pink diamonds, to violet hearts, to spinning pinwheels; and so on and on...from golden snow flakes to silver crosses," plus "green apples" and "pink elephants," "red dots" and "big, black exclamation marks," "blue moons" and "electric lights." When he's in doubt, he produces "blue question marks," and when he is angry he has "brightly colored swords and muskets spinning madly on his back." It's because of his uniqueness that he is considered an outcast to his fellow leopards. Dorothy's group befriend the Leopard with the Changeable Spots where they nickname him "Spots". He joins them on their quest to defeat Terp the Terrible.

The Leopard with the Changeable Spots later starred in the story "Spots in Oz" where he and the Hungry Tiger investigate a spell that causes all the spots to disappear.

Pinny and Gig
Pinny and Gig are two guinea pigs from Ohio who debut in The Hidden Valley of Oz. They came with Jam and Percy to the Land of Oz where Jam's kite landed in Gillikin country. After escaping from Terp the Terrible's castle, Pinny and Gig did not have the taste for adventure and moved in with a farmer and his wife who allowed Jam to stay at their farm for the night.

Prince Pompadore
Prince Pompadore (called Pompa for short) is the prince of Pumperdink who first appears in Kabumpo in Oz. He is the son of King Pompus. Kabumpo the Elephant is his mentor and bodyguard. The plot focuses on Kabumpo and Pompa as they search for the "proper princess" described in a disturbing prophecy delivered to the Pumperdink palace. After many slapstick-filled misadventures, Pompa finds his intended mate, Princess Peg Amy of Suntop Mountain. While Kabumpo becomes a mainstay in Thompson's work, Pompa fades into the background, with his "niche" in the Kabumpo adventures taken by Randy of Regalia. Pompadore appears in The Purple Prince of Oz 10 years later when his family is kidnapped by the wicked fairy Faleero. He and Peg Amy are shown to have a daughter, Pajonia, giving Pompa the distinction of being the only human character explicitly stated to have fathered a child during the "present day" portions of Thompson's Oz books.

Tugg
Tugg is a wooden tugboat.

In Dorothy of Oz, Dorothy, Scarecrow, Tin Man, and Cowardly Lion design and build Tugg from the limbs of the Talking Trees that are on the banks of the Munchkin River, some straw to make it waterproof, vines to make the ropes that held them all together, and a foghorn out of a hollow log with vine for a cord. Using some water and wild red berries, Dorothy converted them into a paint so that she can draw Tugg's mouth. When Tugg is named, Tugg starts to speak where he thanks the group for building him. Tugg tells the Talking Trees that he will travel the Munchkin River and tell them of what he has seen. Dorothy and her group board Tugg and they travel downstream. When Dorothy, Scarecrow, Tin Man, and Cowardly Lion were in the Gamekeeper's maze, Tugg used his foghorn to help them get out before time ran out. Tugg then continues to carry the group down the Munchkin River until they reach the Munchkin Village. When Tugg gets close to where the Dainty China Country is located, Dorothy, Scarecrow, Tin Man, Cowardly Lion, and China Princess disembark as he heads back to the Talking Trees to tell them what he has seen on his journey. Dorothy states to Tugg that they will meet him again as soon as possible. Before her confrontation with the Jester, Dorothy has Wiser the Owl look for Tugg and tell him of their progress. After the Jester was freed from the possession of the Wicked Witch of the West's wand, Tugg later appeared on the part of the Munchkin River near Princess Gayelette's castle with Wiser and the dragons that were encountered along the way.

Tugg appears in Legends of Oz: Dorothy's Return (based on the Dorothy of Oz book) voiced by Patrick Stewart. This version is an old tree who donates his body to make a tugboat for Dorothy, Marshal Mallow, China Princess, and Wiser the Owl to travel the Munchkin River on.

Wiser the Owl
Wiser the Owl is an owl who has an unlucky attraction to molasses.

In Dorothy of Oz, Dorothy and Toto encounter Wiser who mentioned that he got his name because he gets wiser every day. When Dorothy tells Wiser that she is here looking for Scarecrow, Tin Man, Cowardly Lion, and Glinda, Wiser tells Dorothy that she is in Gillikin Country and tells her to head to Candy Country and ask the Great Royal Marshmallow that rules over Candy Country. Wiser points Dorothy in the direction of the Candy Country and leaves while warning her to "watch out for the molasses." Unfortunately, Toto doesn't heed the warning. While traveling to Glinda's castle, Dorothy, Scarecrow, Tin Man, Cowardly Lion, and China Princess run into Wiser as Dorothy tells him of her next mission involving going to Quadling County to meet with Glinda. Wiser tells Dorothy to build a boat and drive it down the Munchkin River. Wiser tells Dorothy that the wood for the boat must come from the Talking Trees that grow along the banks of the Munchkin River. Before Dorothy's confrontation with the Jester, Dorothy ends up encountering Wiser again. He asks if she has found Glinda. Dorothy then asks Wiser to help the Cowardly Lion with a crate and get him into his life-size china doll. After the Cowardly Lion is in his china doll disguise, Dorothy tells Wiser to find Tugg and tell him of their progress. After the Jester is freed from the possession of the Wicked Witch of the West's wand, Wiser appears at the river banks near Princess Gayelette's castle with Tugg and the dragons that Dorothy encountered along the way.

Wiser the Owl appears in Legends of Oz: Dorothy's Return (based on the Dorothy of Oz book) voiced by Oliver Platt.

Witch of the North
The Witch of the North was not named in The Wonderful Wizard of Oz nor was she named in any of Baum's Oz books. However, Baum gave her the name of Locasta in the 1902 musical extravaganza, The Wizard of Oz. Ruth Plumly Thompson, Baum's handpicked successor in writing Oz books, revamped the character and gave her the name of Tattypoo.

This version is not to be confused with the Good Witch of the North.

Quadling Country

Belfaygor of Bourne
Belfaygor of Bourne is a major character in Ruth Plumly Thompson's Jack Pumpkinhead of Oz.

Belfaygor resides in the Land of the Barons location of Bourne in the Quadling Country. He is in love with Shirley Sunshine, but because of a magic spell poorly cast by his Miserable Mesmerizer when he asked for a beard for his wedding day, his beard grows at such a rapid rate that he must carry scissors to constantly cut it. This causes severe problems when sleeping. When he is locked in a prison cell with Peter Brown, Jack Pumpkinhead, and Snif, all except Jack get a close-call as his beard grows in the night, filling so much of the cell that it makes it difficult to breathe.

Belfaygor's curse is often brought up in discussions of the inconsistencies about aging and death in the Land of Oz, as it indicates that mitosis continues to exist in Oz.

After Shirley Sunshine is rescued from Mogodore the Mighty, Belfaygore's beard disappears when he is caught and released from the pirate sack Peter found in The Gnome King of Oz as well as the enchantment being broken by the Wizard of Oz. Afterward, he vows never to grow a beard again as he finally marries Shirley.

Jack Snow's encyclopedia Who's Who in Oz (1954) describes Belfaygor as ruler over all the other barons, although Thompson never implied that this was the case.

In Legends of Oz: Dorothy's Return, Belfaygor is shown among the captives of the Jester that were turned into marionettes.

Bell-snickle
Bell-snickle is the major villain of The Scalawagons of Oz. He is described as being like a blue-green buckwheat cake, and is proud to be a mystery. He interferes with the flabber-gas that operates the Scalawagons, sending them out of control. After his defeat, Jenny Jump used him as a rubber stamp in her shop.

Bell-snickle appears to be named after the German folkloric character Belsnickel, but does not have any obvious resemblance to him.

Snif
Snif is a character who appears in Jack Pumpkinhead of Oz.

Snif is an -iffin which is a doggerel-spouting griffin that lost its "gr." He first appears where he joins up with Peter Brown and Jack Pumpkinhead. Snif, Peter, and Jack later meet Baron Belfaygore and help in rescuing his fiancé Shirley Sunshine from Mogodore the Mighty. After Mogodore is defeated, Snif regains his "gr" and becomes a griffin again.

Munchkin Country

Abatha
Abatha the Good Witch of the East is the title character in Eric Shanower's graphic novel, The Blue Witch of Oz. She fell under a spell during a custody battle with her brother-in-law over custody of her son.

Crunch
Crunch is a gigantic stone man who appears in The Cowardly Lion of Oz. He was created by the wizard Wam during the early history of the Land of Oz. As Wam didn't have a purpose for Crunch, he wandered all over the Land of Oz.

Many years later, Crunch met Notta Bit More and the Cowardly Lion when they fell from the Skyle. He did join their party until got impatient with the customs of non-magical beings. Crunch took the Cowardly Lion to Mustafa in Mudge so that Mustafa can add the Cowardly Lion to his collection of lions. Then Crunch turned the Cowardly Lion and Mustafa's collection of lions to stone. Glinda and the Wizard of Oz used their magic to freeze Crunch. Ozma states that Crunch's frozen body will remain in Mudge as her way to punish Mustafa.

Handy Mandy
Handy Mandy is a goatherder who appears in Handy Mandy in Oz.

She comes from Mt. Mern somewhere in the eastern part of Nonestica where its inhabitants have seven arms. She described each of her hands to King Kerr and his nobles:

A geyser transported Handy Mandy to Keretaria in Munchkin Country. After being reprieved from the dungeon by Nox the Royal Ox, Handy Mandy joins him in finding King Kerry who is the rightful heir to Keretaria. They stumble upon a plot by the Wizard of Wutz to take over the Land of Oz even when Ruggedo is accidentally freed from his jar. When she strikes her silver hammer, she summoned an elf named Himself who turns the Wizard of Wutz and Ruggedo into potted cacti. After order is restored by Ozma, Mandy is finally given gloves. After a month back on Mt. Mern, she uses a wishing pill given to her to emigrated herself and her goat herd to Keretaria to start a new life.

Mooj
Mooj is a "bent and hideous" old Munchkin magician who appears in Ojo in Oz.

He usurped the throne of Seebania and dwells in a clock-filled hut on Moojer Mountain. It took Princess Ozma, Realbad, and the Wizard of Oz to defeat Mooj. Princess Ozma turned him into a drop of water that is sent into the Nonestic Ocean.

Realbad
Realbad is a tall, strong, and handsome man who appears in Ojo in Oz.

He is the chieftain of a bandit gang in Munchkin Country. He is later revealed to be Ree Alla Bad, the rightful King of Seebania, Ojo's father, and nephew of Unc Nuckie.

Snufferbux
Snufferbux, full name, Snufforious Buxorious Blundorious Boroso, is a bear who appears in Ojo in Oz. A group of gypsies captured Snufferbux with a bucket of honey and used him to perform for them. He gained his freedom when he fell in with Ojo and Realbad. Snufferbux accompanied them in their journey across Munchkin Country. After Mooj is defeated, Ozma provided Snufferbux with satisfaction by having the gypsies that captured him exiled from the Land of Oz.

X. Pando
X. Pando is a tall man with accordion-like legs who appears in Ojo in Oz.

X. Pando is an elevator man who lifts people to the top of Moojer Mountain. The payment is something minor like a brief dance. Though it isn't certain how much traffic he bears.

Zif
Zif is a Munchkin who appears in The Royal Book of Oz. He is a student at Wogglebug's College of Art and Athletic Perfection.

Winkie Country

Comfortable Camel
The Comfortable Camel is a Bactrian camel who came to the Land of Oz in The Royal Book of Oz. He and his companion the Doubtful Dromedary got lost in a sandstorm and ended up in Oz near the Deadly Desert where they met Dorothy Gale. The two of them assisted Dorothy Gale, Cowardly Lion, and Sir Hokes of Pokes in searching for Scarecrow.

Doubtful Dromedary
The Doubtful Dromedary is a dromedary who came to the Land of Oz in The Royal Book of Oz and doubts everything he says. He and his companion the Comfortable Camel got lost in a sandstorm and ended up in Oz near the Deadly Desert where they met Dorothy Gale. The two of them assisted Dorothy Gale, Cowardly Lion, and Sir Hokes of Pokes in searching for Scarecrow.

Peg Amy
Peg Amy is a wooden doll from Kabumpo in Oz who is revealed to be the long-lost princess of Sun Top Mountain in Winkie Country. After being freed from her enchantment, Peg Amy married Prince Pompadore and they ruled Sun Top Mountain together, though they spent part of their time in his father's kingdom, Pumperdink. In The Purple Prince of Oz they have a daughter named Pajonia, making Peg the only named human in Oz to have given birth in the "present day" of Ruth Plumly Thompson's stories.

Outside of Oz

A-B-Sea Serpent
The A-B-Sea Serpent is a large snake made of alphabet blocks who comes from Mer City in the Nonestic Ocean.

First appearing in The Royal Book of Oz, the A-B-Sea Serpent and the Rattlesnake were on vacation in the Munchkin River where they encounter the Scarecrow. After A-B-Sea Serpent helped Scarecrow cross the Munchkin River, he invited A-B-Sea Serpent and Rattlesnake to the Emerald City to meet Princess Ozma, Betsy Bobbin, Patchwork Girl, and Tin Woodman.

Rattlesnake
The Rattlesnake is a snake made of 100 rattles who is the A-B-Sea Serpent's companion.

First appearing in The Royal Book of Oz, the A-B-Sea Serpent and the Rattlesnake were on vacation in the Munchkin River where they encounter the Scarecrow. After A-B-Sea Serpent helped Scarecrow cross the Munchkin River, he invited A-B-Sea Serpent and Rattlesnake to the Emerald City to meet Princess Ozma, Betsy Bobbin, Patchwork Girl, and Tin Woodman.

Clocker
Clocker is a clock-headed man who serves as the wise man of Menankypoo and first appears in Pirates in Oz.

He can only speak once every 15 minutes when the clock sounds and its cuckoo emerges with a note. The people of Menankypoo confined Clocker to Kadj the Conqueror's cave for "putting ideas in the former king's head." Clocker forms an alliance with Ruggedo in his latest plot to conquer the Land of Oz. This starts when they take advantage of the invading pirates and persuade them to side with Ruggedo. With help from Peter and Captain Salt, Princess Ozma thwarts the invasion and one of the things she does is keep Clocker so that he can be reprogrammed.

Captain Samuel Salt
Captain Samuel Salt is the sea captain of the Crescent Moon who first appears in Pirates in Oz.

While he gained fame as a pirate captain, he was most interested in exploring causing his crew to abandon him and take two of his ships. When he arrived on Octagon Island, he encountered King Ako whose men also deserted him. The two of them left alongside Ako's companion Roger the Read Bird. The three of them met Peter Brown when they were looking for their deserted crew. After Ruggedo and the pirates are defeated, Captain Salt leaves the pirate business and remains in Oz as the Royal Explorer.

In Captain Salt in Oz, Captain Salt had the Crescent Moon refitted by Jinnicky the Red Jinn. He, King Ako, Roger the Read Bird where they discovered Patrippany, Ozamaland, Peakenspire Island, the Sea Forest, and Seeweegia.

In The Wonder City of Oz, Captain Salt was present at Ozma's birthday party.

In The Scalawagons of Oz, Captain Salt was present when the Wizard of Oz unveiled his latest invention in the form of the Scalawagons.

Captain Salt is one of Thompson's more popular Oz creations, but his copyright status has restricted his use by other authors. While his titular novel entered the public domain in 1965 due to a clerical oversight, his first appearance remains protected until 1 January 2027.

Jinnicky the Red Jinn

Jinnicky the Red Jinn is a character who frequently appears in Ruth Plumly Thompson's Oz books. He is depicted as a character who owns a lot of slaves and has his red body enclosed in a ginger jar. For long-distance travel he uses a magic jinriskishka. He maintains a friendly but sincere rivalry with the Wizard of Oz and is anxious to stop Faleero in "The Purple Prince of Oz" before the Wizard of Oz does.

Pigasus

Pigasus is a flying pig character written by Ruth Plumly Thompson in the 1930s. Her Pigasus was also a winged pig. As with Pegasus, his riders gained the gift of poesy, being magically compelled to speak in rhyming jingles while on his back. The character first appeared in Pirates in Oz (1931) and played a major role in the plot of The Wishing Horse of Oz (1935).

Other post-Baum characters

Baum's successors created other characters for the series that are either mentioned in passing, or play minor roles in the series. The following are in this category:

 Bangladore - A young candy giant that lives in a forest in Winkie Country.
 Blink - The housekeeper of the Scarecrow's mansion in Winkie Country.
 Mops - A worker at Scarecrow's mansion who serves as his cook.
 Pid - A servant of Sir Hokes.
 Wag - A traveling rabbit who was formerly bribed by Ruggedo and has a weakness for collecting. He later joins Kabumpo and Prince Pompadore in their quest to stop Ruggedo and Glegg.

See also
 List of Oz characters (created by Baum)
 List of Wicked characters

References

List
Oz